Betulaphis is a genus of true bugs belonging to the family Aphididae.

Species
The following species are recognised in the genus :

Betulaphis brevipilosa 
Betulaphis hissarica 
Betulaphis kozlovi 
Betulaphis longicornis 
Betulaphis pelei 
Betulaphis quadrituberculata 
BOLD:AAI4153 (Betulaphis sp.)

References

Aphididae